Baughman (Americanized form of German and Swiss German Bachmann or Baumann, compare Boughman) is a surname. Notable people with the surname include:

Baughman Center, two buildings on the University of Florida campus, ranked 3rd by American Institute of Architects on its list of Florida Architecture: 100 Years. 100 Places.
Charlotte Baughman, fictional character portrayed by Anya Taylor-Joy as the first girlfriend of Barack Obama in the 2016 American drama film Barry
Deiton Baughman (born 1996), American tennis player 
Elise Baughman, American voice actress
George F. Baughman (1915–2004), American university president and United States Naval Reserve officer
J. Ross Baughman, American Pulitzer Prize winning photojournalist 
James L. Baughman (1952–2016), American journalism professor 
John Baughman (1941–2000), American murderer and suspected serial killer
Justin Baughman (born 1974), American baseball player
Mary Baughman (1874-1956), American physician, medical college professor
Milo Baughman (1923–2003), American furniture designer
R. Wayne Baughman (1941-2022), American wrestler and wrestling coach
Red Baughman, American football coach
T. H. Baughman (born 1947), professor of history and author of books on Antarctic exploration
U. E. Baughman (1905–1978), chief of the United States Secret Service
Americanized surnames